Cantiq is a çiberek that is grilled, not fried.

See also

çiberek

Tatar cuisine
Turkish cuisine